Chris Wolfenden (born June 22, 1977 in London, Ontario) is a male volleyball player from Canada, who competed for the Men's National Team as a libero. He was a member of the national squad who ended up in seventh place at the 2007 Pan American Games in Rio de Janeiro, Brazil.

References
Canada Olympic Committee

1977 births
Living people
Canadian men's volleyball players
Dalhousie University alumni
Pan American Games competitors for Canada
Sportspeople from London, Ontario
Volleyball people from Ontario
Volleyball players at the 2007 Pan American Games